Wellesbourne Watermill is a fine historic flour mill near Wellesbourne, Warwickshire, England on a domesday site. Situated on the River Dene, the mill is a Grade II listed building and is described as "A very complete example of a mill and mill house".

History
Formerly known as Byford Mill, it was rebuilt in 1834. It ran commercially until 1958, latterly using a belt drive from a traction engine, the wheel last being used in 1939. The mill office door carries a date 1785 which formerly belonged to a post mill which stood in the adjacent field. The mill house is 18th century, thus considerably older than the present mill building.

In 1988 the  watermill was restored to working order by the Hamilton family, predominantly Sir Andrew Hamilton, with millwright David Nicholls and the Chiltern Partnership, and is still owned by the Walton Estate.  It is not currently open to the public. The adjacent mill house is now a private dwelling.

Machinery

The internal wheel is breastshot and is unusual in that it carries three sets of clasp arms around the timber axle. The spur wheel measures  and drives two stone nuts of  diameter.

See also
List of watermills in the United Kingdom

References

Grade II listed buildings in Warwickshire
Watermills in England
Stratford-on-Avon District